Paris Francesco Alghisi (June 19, 1666 – March 29–30, 1733) was an Italian organist and composer. He was born in and died in Brescia.

Notable works

Operas
 L'amor di Curzio per la patria (libretto by G. C. Corradi, 1690, Venice)
 Il trionfo della continenza (libretto di G. C. Corradi, 1690, Venice)

Oratorios

All oratorios were premiered in Brescia.
La giornata del Diporto (1692)
Le piaghe sante da una ferita (1693)
La mensa bersagliatrice dell'eresia (1695)
Il trionfo della fede (1697)
Megera delusa (1698)
La gara del merito (1699)
Il transito del glorioso S. Antonio di Padoa (1700)
Il disinganno dell'intelletto (1701)
Il serafino nell'amare e cherubino nell'intendere (1703)
Il trionfo della sapienza (1704)
Lite in cielo tra la sapienza e la santità (1705)

Other works
 Sonata da camera for 2 violins and violoncello/clavicembalo, op.1 (1693, Modena)
 Cantate (1694, Bologna)
 Suaves accentus (mottetto per soprano, archi e organo)
 Divote canzonette
 Credo a quatro, per archi, organo e tastiera
 Various sacred works

References
L. Cozzando: Libraria bresciana, prima e seconda parte nuovamente aperta dal M.R.P. Maestro Leonardo Cozzando, servita Bresciano (Brescia, 1694)
F. Dalola: Memorie spettanti alla vita del servo di Dio P.F. Alghisi da Brescia (Florence)
A. Valentini: I musicisti bresciani e il Teatro Grande (Brescia, 1894)
M.T.R. Barezzani e altri: La musica a Brescia nel Settecento (Brescia, 1981)
M.T.R. Barezzani: La pratica strumentale nelle feste accademiche del Settecento, Cultura, religione e politica nell'età de Angelo Maria Querini, pp. 607–22 (Brescia, 1982)
O. Termini: Organists and Chapel Masters at the Cathedral of Brescia (1608–1779), Note d'archivio, vol. III, pp. 73–90 (1985)
O. Termini: Instrumental Music and Musicians at S. Maria della Pace in Brescia at the End of the Seventeenth Century, Liuteria e musica strumentale a Brescia tra Cinque e Seicento, vol. II, pp. 355–88 (Brescia, 1992)

17th-century Italian composers
18th-century Italian composers
Italian male composers
Italian organists
Male organists
1666 births
1733 deaths
17th-century male musicians